This article concerns the period 39 BC – 30 BC.

Significant people
 Mark Antony, Roman politician and general (83–30 BC)
 Pharaoh Cleopatra VII of Egypt (lived 70/69–30 BC, reigned 51–30 BC)
 Gaius Julius Caesar Octavianus, known in English as Octavian, Roman politician and general (63 BC–AD 14)
 Pharaoh Ptolemy XV Caesarion (lived 47–30 BC, reigned 44–30 BC)

References